Connah's Quay Power Station is a 1,420 MW gas-fired power station to the west of Connah's Quay in Flintshire in North Wales. It is next to the A548, being tightly situated between the road and the south bank of the River Dee.

History
The current station is the successor to the first station in the area, a coal-fired power station, located less than a kilometre to the southwest of the current station. The old station was opened on the 16 September 1954 by Lord Citrine, the chairman of the British Electricity Authority. The station was originally planned to only be of 60 megawatts (MW), but it was realised that a larger station would be needed. The coal-fired station was built in three stages, each stage having two 30 MW generating sets, giving a total generating capacity of 180 MW. The stages were completed in 1953, 1955 and 1957.
Coal was provided by train from the Point of Ayr undersea colliery. There were two unloading sidings controlled by Rockcliffe Hall signalbox. Water for the station was cooled by three hyperbolic cooling towers.

The electricity output and thermal efficiency of the station was as follows:

The station was closed in 1984 and demolished in 1992.

Since its decommission and demolition, the site of the old power station has remained undeveloped.

Gas-fired CCGT station 
Construction of the new gas-fired station began in July 1993. The station was built as a turnkey project by GEC Alsthom with all principal equipment supplied by GEC Alsthom divisions. Henry Boot were sub-contracted to undertake the civil engineering and building works.

The station was completed in March 1996 and cost £580m. It was officially opened by Margaret Beckett on 4 July 1997. In June 1998, the station's visitor centre opened. The station was initially owned by Powergen, who became E.ON UK in 2004 and was transferred to Uniper in 2015. The station is currently Uniper's largest CCGT power station.

The power station is not to be confused with the Deeside Power Station, a similar CCGT power station with two chimneys situated on the north bank of the River Dee, one mile to the east of the Connah's Quay station. The two plants are separated by the Flintshire Bridge, with many electricity pylons running alongside.

Specification
It is a CCGT type power station that runs on natural gas. It is made up of four 330 MW modules - hence the four chimneys. Each module has an Alsthom Frame 9FA gas turbine, a Stein Industrie heat recovery steam generator and a steam turbine; in a single-shaft layout. The gas comes via an eighteen-mile pipeline from the Point of Ayr gas terminal, where gas is received from Eni's (formerly BHP and originally owned by Denver-based Hamilton Oil) Celtic gas fields (Hamilton and Hamilton North) in Liverpool Bay via the Douglas Complex. The station opened soon after the gas from the field was first produced. The station employs around 81 people.

Gas treatment plant 
The quality of this gas, although adequate for use in the power station, was not suitable for delivery to the National Transmission System (NTS). Because of the high nitrogen content (8–11 mol %) the Wobbe number was too low (45.9–48.1 MJ/m3) and the total sulphur content (35 ppm) was too high. The plant was owned and operated by PowerGen (now E.ON UK) and started up in November 1997, the plant was built by Costain's, the capital cost of the project was £40 million.

Operation 
In the gas treatment plant gas passes through molecular sieves to remove sulphur to less than 15 ppm and water to less than 1 ppm to prevent ice formation in the downstream refrigeration plant. The dry sulphur-free gas passes through an activated carbon bed to remove any mercury to protect the downstream aluminium heat exchangers. The gas then passes to the cryogenic nitrogen removal system where it is cooled to -100 °C by Joule–Thomson chilling. In the pre-separation column the gas is separated into a methane stream and a nitrogen-rich stream. In the low temperature (-185 °C) double column the nitrogen-enriched gas is separated into the reject nitrogen stream containing less than 1.5% methane and a low pressure methane stream containing less than 1.5% nitrogen. The liquid methane stream is pumped to 10 bar and then to the sales gas compressors. The reject nitrogen stream is heated and used to regenerate the molecular sieves. Then the sulphur-rich gas is burnt in a thermal oxidiser. Gas was exported through a 30-inch 3 km pipeline to Burton Point where it was delivered into the National Transmission System.

As the production of gas from the offshore field declined so there was no longer a surplus of gas available at Connah's Quay. The Burton Point terminal is now identified by National Grid as an NTS offtake supplying gas to Connah's Quay power station.

References

External links

 Uniper UK
 Panoramic view
 Demolition of former coal power station
 Steam discharge as seen from the A55
 Worker killed in August 2007
 UK CCGTs
 Henry Boot Construction

Natural gas-fired power stations in Wales
Buildings and structures in Flintshire